Abdel Aziz Essafoui (born 20 August 1970) is a Moroccan former wrestler. He competed in the men's Greco-Roman 90 kg at the 1996 Summer Olympics.

References

External links
 

1970 births
Living people
Moroccan male sport wrestlers
Olympic wrestlers of Morocco
Wrestlers at the 1996 Summer Olympics
Place of birth missing (living people)
20th-century Moroccan people
21st-century Moroccan people